Albert III of Austria (9 September 1349 – 29 August 1395), known as Albert with the Braid (Pigtail), a member of the House of Habsburg, was Duke of Austria from 1365 until his death.

Biography 
Albert III was born in the ducal residence of Vienna, the third son of the Habsburg duke Albert II of Austria and his wife Joanna of Pfirt. Even though his father had determined a house law, whereby the four sons were obliged to rule jointly and equally, the eldest brother Rudolf IV assumed the reins of government after his father's death in 1358. He reaffirmed his supremacy issuing the Privilegium Maius.  However, as his marriage remained childless he again had to share his power with his younger brothers. In 1365 Rudolf IV, Albert III, and Leopold III together signed the foundation certificate of the Vienna University (Alma Mater Rudolphina Vindobonensis); Rudolf died a few months later at the age of 25.

Divided rule
Albert, then the eldest surviving brother (the second-born son Frederick III had already died in 1362), inherited the rule and shared it with his younger brother Leopold III. Both were formally enfeoffed with the Duchy of Austria, Duchy of Styria, Duchy of Carinthia, and Duchy of Carniola by Emperor Charles IV. In 1369 the Habsburg dukes succeeded the late Meinhard III, Count of Gorizia-Tyrol in the County of Tyrol, when after a drawn-out conflict the Wittelsbach Duke Stephen II of Bavaria finally renounced his rights.

In 1368 the Habsburg brothers purchased the Swabian city of Freiburg. But their attempt to gain control over the Adriatic port of Trieste failed in an armed conflict with the Republic of Venice in 1369/70. Trieste was not won until 1382, when the citizens sought protection from Venice by subjecting themselves to Austrian rule. In 1374 the Austrian dukes inherited large territories in the Windic March and Istria from the late Albert III, Count of Gorizia, which they attached to the Duchy of Carniola. The next year they acquired the Swabian lordship of Feldkirch from the Counts of Montfort, the nucleus of the Habsburg possessions in later Vorarlberg.

Tension developed between the brothers, and in 1379 Albert and Leopold, by the Treaty of Neuberg  divided the extended Habsburg territories. Albert received Austria proper (Austria Inferior), while Leopold get Styria, Carinthia and Carniola (Austria Interior), Tyrol (Austria Superior) and the dynasty's original possessions in Swabia (Austria Anterior). The division of the Habsburgs into the Albertinian Line and Leopoldian line was a significant disadvantage in competition with the rival Wittelsbach and Luxembourg dynasties. It persisted until 1490, when Archduke Sigismund of Tyrol and Further Austria handed over his estates to his cousin King Maximilian I.

Politics
In 1377, Albert went on a crusade in Prussia against pagan Baltic Lithuanian and Samogitian tribes.

Meanwhile, the expansion of the Habsburg dukes in Swabia collided with the growth of the Old Swiss Confederacy and sparked armed revolts. In 1386 Duke Leopold III and numerous Austrian nobles were killed in a disastrous defeat at the 1386 Battle of Sempach, whereafter Albert once again became sole ruler over the Albertinian and Leopoldian lands, acting as regent for his minor nephews. Another attempt to restore Habsburg rule in Swabia failed, when Albert's knights were again defeated by the Swiss pike squares in the 1388 Battle of Näfels and the duke had to call for an armistice. 

In the Austrian lands, his government was beneficial to the realm, as he supported the arts and sciences. Albert was an apt scholar himself, particularly as a mathematician and astrologer. The eldest preserved book of the Austrian National Library, a 1386 Evangelion, comes from his personal property. The duke expanded the University of Vienna and, during the Western Schism, reached the consent of Pope Urban VI to establish a theological faculty. He continued the building of St. Stephen's Cathedral and attempted to refurbish Vienna modelled on Emperor Charles' residence in Prague. Albert's nickname refers to his particular hairstyle, part of the vestments of a short-lived chivalric order (Zopforden) he had established and which dissolved upon his death.

By the end of his reign, Albert had established a firm princely rule over the Austrian duchy, stretching along the Danube from the Hungarian border on the Leitha River in the east to the Hausruck range in the west. In the conflict over the succession upon the death of Emperor Charles IV in 1378, Albert joined the forces of the Luxembourg heirs Jobst of Moravia and Sigismund against the incapable king Wenceslaus and seemed a likely candidate for the German throne himself. However, he died in August 1395 while staying in his Laxenburg hunting lodge, during the preparations of a military campaign to achieve Wenceslaus' deposition which took place in 1400. He is buried in the Ducal Crypt in the Stephansdom cathedral in Vienna.

Family and children

Albert III was married twice. The first marriage, after 19 March 1366, was with Elisabeth of Bohemia, a daughter of the Luxembourg emperor Charles IV. This marriage was childless; his wife died at age fifteen. Afterwards, he married Beatrix of Nuremberg, a daughter of the Hohenzollern burgrave Frederick V of Nuremberg and his wife Elisabeth of Meissen, a member of the House of Wettin and a descendant of the extinct Babenberg dukes of Austria.

Beatrix gave him his only son, Albert IV, who succeeded him but soon had to cede the rule over the Inner Austrian, Tyrolean and Further Austrian possessions to his Leopoldian cousins William and Leopold IV. The Albertinian line became extinct with the death of Ladislaus the Posthumous in 1457.

Ancestry

References

Sources

External links

|-

Albert 3 of Austria
Albert 3 of Austria
14th-century dukes of Austria
Albert 3
Albert 3
Albert 3
Albert 3 of Austria
Dukes of Carniola
Burials at St. Stephen's Cathedral, Vienna